Hannah Shameema Winkler (born 5 November 1985) is a South African politician. She is a member of parliament for the Democratic Alliance and the party's former shadow deputy minister of environment, forestry and fisheries.

Education
Winkler has an honours degree in politics.

Political career
Winkler joined the Democratic Alliance as a researcher and media officer. For the 2019 general election, she was the party's campaign manager in the eThekwini Metropolitan Municipality.

Parliamentary career
In the build-up to the 2019 general election, Winkler was placed eighth on the DA's regional list, 28th on the party's provincial list and 76th on the party's national list. She was elected to the National Assembly on the regional list and became a member of parliament on 22 May 2019.

On 5 June 2019, the DA parliamentary leader, Mmusi Maimane, appointed Winkler to the post of shadow deputy minister of environment, forestry and fisheries. Later that month, she was appointed to that specific portfolio's committee.

On 5 December 2020, she was appointed as an additional deputy member to the tourism portfolio of the John Steenhuisen's shadow cabinet.

Committee membership
Portfolio Committee on Environment, Forestry and Fisheries

References

External links
Ms Hannah Shameema Winkler at Parliament of South Africa

Living people
1985 births
People from Durban
Democratic Alliance (South Africa) politicians
Members of the National Assembly of South Africa